According to "Pallas's Great Lexikon" ---

Galeotti (Galeotto) Marzio (Martius) was a humanist, poet, philosopher, and astrologer in the 15th century. He was born in Narni (Umbria) around 1427, and died in Bohemia in 1497. He studied the culture, language and literature of the classical ancient times from his early youth. After serving as a soldier for a short period, in 1447 he became a pupil of Guarino in Ferrara. Here he became an intimate friend of JanusPannonius, who was a Hungarian student there at that time, and later became a bishop of Pécs (in Southern Hungary). Galeotti learned the Greek language from Janus Pannonius. After a pilgrimage to Rome Galeotti gave lectures in 1450 at the University of Padova about classical authors, and studied medicine as well. In Padova he married a Venetian (or, according to some sources, Lombardian) girl. She was a daughter of Bartolomeo di Montagna)*. They had a son, Giovanni, and several daughters. After the death of his Italian wife he married a Hungarian noblewoman (her family name was Szepessy).

In March 1461 he was in Hungary (probably in Buda) together with his family, in the company of Janus Pannonius. After a short-term stay in Padova, in 1462 he spent a longer time travelling in Spain, France and
England, practising medicine. In his book (2 volumes), De Homine, he reflects on the physical and philosophic aspects of human nature and his main concern if the well-being of man. The first volume reflects on the external aspects of the human body whereas the second discusses the nature of some diseases and the internal aspects of the human organism. During his journey he made friends and earned a considerable amount of money. In 1464 he was professor of the Latin language at the University of Bologna. Here Galeotti had an intensive polemic with Francis Philelphus.

In 1468 Janus Pannonius - who at that time was on a mission in Italy - took him to Hungary. Galeotti spent a long time in the court of King Matthias Corvinus where the king soon took a liking to him. Galeotti became a confidant, companion and court historian of King Matthias.  However, there are no reliable sources stating that Galeotti was  the tutor of King Matthias or that of Matthias' son, Johannes Corvinus.

Galeotti accompanied King Matthias on his campaign to Bohemia against the Czech King George Podiebrad. In 1471 he wrote a book in Buda of the title "De homine libri duo" about physiology and medicine, a description
of the parts of the body. This book was dedicated to Archbishop Janos Vitacz, who was the uncle of Janus Pannonius. From 1473 to 1477 Galeotti gave lectures in Bologna about humanistic studies.
He wrote between 1476 and 1478 his book of the title "De incognitis vulgo", which was dedicated to King Matthias. The book is still unpublished. As he expressed in his book the heretical view that all men, who live according to common sense and the laws of nature, will find salvation - he was arrested by the Venetian inquisition on his estate in Montagna near Padova, and they had him before the court. His property was confiscated, his wife was also put to prison, he was put on the pillory on the market of Venice, his book was burned, and he was forced to publicly recant his "diabolical" doctrines. He was in prison for 6 months, on dry bread and cold water. Pope IV. Sixtus cited him to Rome on the intervention of Lorenzo di Medici and King Matthias. Here he was cleared of the charge of heresy and he even regained his properties.

In 1479 he spent some time in the court of King Matthias, however, he returned to Italy soon. In 1482 he asked from King Matthias for an engagement present for his daughters in Baden near Vienna, and received it. From 1484 to 1487 - supposedly in Italy - he wrote his book of the title "De egregie, sapienter et iocose dictis ac factis Matthiae regis" (About the excellent, sapient and ingenious sayings and deeds of King Matthias. First published by Sigismund Tordai in 1563. Translated into Hungarian language in the 19th century by Gabor Kazinczy and Ferdinand Barna.). This work contains many interesting data relating to the history of culture in Hungary, anecdotes and characteristic stories about King Matthias and his court. The book was dedicated to Prince Joannes Corvinus, son of King Matthias.

Galeotti dedicated one of his books, La Doctrina Promiscua, to Lorenzo di Medici, and another in 1492 to Charles VIII, King of France, in whose court he spent some time after the death of King Matthias (who died in 1490). The title of this
book was "De Excellentibus", this was a somewhat abridged and revised version of another of his books: "De promiscua doctrina".

Until now it is not confirmed that the members of the Martius family living nowadays in Germany are Galeotti's descendants.

Martius Galeotti (1442-1494) was an Italian astrologer, born in Narni, Umbria. He settled first in Boulogne and then went to Hungary after his religious views proved unpopular with the Catholic Church. In Hungary he became secretary to King, Matthias Corvinus, and also tutor to the latter's son, Prince John. His work De jocose Dictis et Factis Regis Matthhias Covirni further incurred the displeasure of the church and he was taken to Venice where he was imprisoned for a time. He was released following the intervention of Pope Sixtus IV, whose tutor he is said to have been at an earlier date. He subsequently returned to France where he became state-astrologer to King Louis XI.

Galeotti appears in Sir Walter Scott's story of medieval France, Quentin Durward.

References

1427 births
1494 deaths
People from Narni
Italian Renaissance humanists
15th-century astrologers
15th-century Italian physicians
Italian astrologers